Planta Solar Fuente Álamo is a photovoltaic power station in Fuente-Álamo, Murcia in Spain. The power station has a capacity of 26 megawatts and its annual output is 44 GWh, equivalent to supply electricity to 13,000 households.

The project was developed and constructed by Gestamp Solar. It was later acquired by FRV. The power station cost nearly €200 million and it was commissioned in 2008.

See also

Photovoltaic power station

References

Photovoltaic power stations in Spain
Energy in the Region of Murcia